Anne Fadiman (born August 7, 1953) is an American essayist and reporter. Her interests include literary journalism, essays, memoir, and autobiography. She has received the National Book Critics Circle Award, the Los Angeles Times Book Prize for Current Interest, and the Salon Book Award.

Early life and education
She is the daughter of the renowned literary, radio, and television personality Clifton Fadiman and World War II correspondent and author Annalee Jacoby Fadiman. She attended Harvard University, graduating in 1975 from Radcliffe College with a bachelor of arts degree. At Harvard, she roomed with Wendy Lesser (Benazir Bhutto and Kathleen Kennedy were also in the same dorm).

Career

Writing
Fadiman's 1997 book The Spirit Catches You and You Fall Down: A Hmong Child, Her American Doctors, and the Collision of Two Cultures won the 1997 National Book Critics Circle Award as well as the Los Angeles Times Book Prize for Current Interest, and the Salon Book Award. Researched in a small county hospital in California, it examined a Hmong family from Laos with a child with epilepsy, and their cultural, linguistic, and medical struggles with the American medical system.

She has written two books of essays. The first, Ex Libris: Confessions of a Common Reader, was published in 1998. The second, At Large and At Small: Familiar Essays (2007), touched on such topics as arctic explorers, Samuel Taylor Coleridge and ice cream; it was the source of a quotation in The New York Times Sunday Acrostic. She also edited Rereadings: Seventeen Writers Revisit Books They Love (2005) and the Best American Essays 2003.

Fadiman has published a memoir about her relationship with her father, The Wine Lover's Daughter (2017).

Editing
Fadiman was a founding editor of the Library of Congress magazine Civilization.

She was the fourth editor of the Phi Beta Kappa quarterly The American Scholar since 1997, and under her direction, it won three National Magazine Awards in six years. She left The American Scholar, where she was paid an annual salary of $60,000, in 2004, in the midst of a dispute over budgetary issues. At the time of her departure the journal faced a budget deficit of about $250,000 and a circulation of about 28,000.

Teaching
Since January 2005, in a program established by Yale alumnus Paul E. Francis, Anne Fadiman has been Yale University's first Francis Writer in Residence, a position that allows her to teach one or two non-fiction writing seminars each year, and advise, mentor, and interact with students and editors of undergraduate publications.

In 2012 she received the Richard H. Brodhead '68 Prize for Teaching Excellence by Non-Ladder Faculty.

Personal life
Fadiman is married to American author George Howe Colt. They have two children and a dog named Typo.

Bibliography

Author 

 The Spirit Catches You and You Fall Down: A Hmong Child, Her American Doctors, and the Collision of Two Cultures (1997)
 Ex Libris: Confessions of a Common Reader (1998)
 At Large and At Small: Familiar Essays (2007)
 The Wine Lover's Daughter (2017)

Editor 

 Best American Essays 2003 (2003)
 Rereadings: Seventeen Writers Revisit Books They Love (2005)

References

External links 
 A 'Wine Lover's Daughter' Savors Her Dad's Vintage Story, NPR

Living people
1953 births
Radcliffe College alumni
20th-century American essayists
American women journalists
American magazine editors
American women essayists
Journalists from New York City
Yale University faculty
Women magazine editors
American women academics
21st-century American essayists
20th-century American journalists
21st-century American journalists
20th-century American women writers
21st-century American women writers
21st-century American academics